Dinesh Kumar Singh and popularly called as Dinesh Yadav was an Indian politician. He was elected to the Bihar Legislative Assembly from Jagdishpur (Vidhan Sabha constituency) as the 2010 Member of Bihar Legislative Assembly as a member of the Rashtriya Janata Dal.

References

Rashtriya Janata Dal politicians
Bihar MLAs 2010–2015
People from Arrah
Living people
Year of birth missing (living people)